The 2009 V8 Supercar season was the thirteenth season in which V8 Supercars contested the premier Australian motor racing series for touring cars. It was the 50th season of touring car racing in Australia from the first Australian Touring Car Championship, latter to become the V8 Supercar Championship Series, and the first Armstrong 500, which would evolve into the Bathurst 1000.

The season featured the thirteenth V8 Supercar Championship Series which began on 21 March at the Clipsal 500 on the streets of Adelaide and finished on 6 December at the Homebush Street Circuit. The championship comprised 26 races held at 14 events, visiting all states and the Northern Territory of Australia as well as New Zealand. A non-championship event supported the 2009 Australian Grand Prix. The season also included the tenth second tier Development Series, promoted as the Fujitsu V8 Supercar Series, with all seven rounds held as support races for the V8 Supercar Championship Series. For the second year, a third tier series was run, as the Shannons V8 Touring Car National Series. Its five rounds were held at rounds of the Shannons Nationals Motor Racing Championships.

Review
The 2009 V8 Supercar Championship Series was dominated by the season long rivalry between the leading Ford team, Triple Eight Race Engineering and its drivers Jamie Whincup and Craig Lowndes and the leading Holden team, the Holden Racing Team and its drivers, Will Davison and Garth Tander. Between them they won 22 of the seasons 26-point scoring races. HRT won the most of the seasons prizes, winning the teams prize, leading the charge to Holden regaining the manufacturers prize, the drivers combining to win the Bathurst 1000 and the Phillip Island 500, but Triple Eight won the biggest prize with Jamie Whincup retaining the drivers' championship. Whincup personally won half of the 22 races the two teams won together, the backbone of his title retention with his season beginning Adelaide 500 as his centrepiece and Lowndes chipped in by dominating Winton and winning the non-championship event held on the Australian Grand Prix support program. Lowndes was fourth in the championship behind Tander, but Davison was the revelation of the season, stepping up to HRT after a strong season with Dick Johnson Racing in 2008, Davison pushed Whincup almost all the way to the title until Davison faded over the final two events at Barbagallo and the new Sydney 500.

Best of the rest was a battle between two Ford teams. Mark Winterbottom won at Surfers Paradise and finished fifth in the drivers championship for Ford Performance Racing while at Dick Johnson Racing, Steven Johnson finished sixth and his teammate James Courtney took two street circuit victories at the Townsville 400 and Sydney 500. The only upset win was Michael Caruso's debut win at Hidden Valley Raceway. Caruso's win for Garry Rogers Motorsport was also the only Holden race win not scored by the Holden Racing Team as the three top Ford team shared honours.

Ford also had success in the second tier series with MW Motorsport driver Jonathon Webb charging to the series crown, utterly dominant in the second half of the series as Ford drivers swamped the top seven positions in the development series. James Moffat was series runner up from David Russell with TV personality racer Grant Denyer putting his best ever season to finish a strong fourth position. The emerging third tier series was won strongly by Adam Wallis in his self-run Holden Commodore.

Race calendar

* - fastest lap of official pre-season test days
VSC - V8 Supercar Championship Series
FVS - Fujitsu V8 Supercar Series
STCS - Shannons V8 Touring Car National Series

V8 Supercar Championship Series

Fujitsu V8 Supercar Series

V8 Supercars Manufacturers Challenge

Shannons V8 Touring Car National Series

References

Linked articles contain additional references.

External links
 Official V8 Supercar website
 2009 Racing Results Archive

Supercar seasons